HMS Glasgow was a wooden screw frigate, the fifth ship of the name to serve in the Royal Navy.

Glasgow was launched at Portsmouth Dockyard on 28 March 1861. Despite ironclad ships being introduced in 1858 and effectively rendering wooden hulls obsolete Glasgow was built of wood to use up some of the extensive stocks of ship building timber then stored in Britain. Indeed Glasgow would be one of the last Royal Navy Vessels to be made entirely from wood. Her one and only foreign deployment was as flagship to the East Indies from 1871 to 1875. From 24 May 1871 until her decommissioning she was commanded by Captain Theodore Morton Jones. During this time she was the flagship of Rear-Admiral James Cockburn and then of Arthur Cumming, following Cockburn's death. Glasgow was paid off on 20 July 1875 and sold for breaking up in December 1884. Glasgow was used by Sultan Bargash of Zanzibar as the model for his royal yacht HHS Glasgow, Bargash having been impressed by the ship when she visited Zanzibar in 1873.

Notes

References

Lyon, David & Winfield, Rif: The Sail and Steam Navy List: All the Ships of the Royal Navy 1815–1889 Chatham Publishing, 2004. .
.

 

Frigates of the Royal Navy
Ships built in Portsmouth
Victorian-era frigates of the United Kingdom
1861 ships